Interstellar: Original Motion Picture Soundtrack is the soundtrack album composed by Hans Zimmer to the 2014 film Interstellar directed by Christopher Nolan. Zimmer had previously scored Nolan's The Dark Knight film trilogy and Inception. The soundtrack garnered critical acclaim. Prior to its digital release, it was nominated for an Academy Award and Original Score at the Hollywood Music in Media Awards. The soundtrack was released on November 17, 2014 via the WaterTower label.

Critical response

The score received critical acclaim. Reviewing for BBC News, Nicholas Barber felt, "Hans Zimmer's music makes the film seem even more colossal than it would otherwise: Zimmer invokes the original meaning of 'pulls out all the stops', rattling our teeth with reverberating pipe-organ chords." Scott Foundas, a chief film critic at Variety, stated, "Hans Zimmer contributes one of his most richly imagined and inventive scores, which ranges from a gentle electronic keyboard melody to brassy, Strauss-ian crescendos.

Many critics have noted distinct similarities between the score and the work of Philip Glass, especially Koyaanisqatsi (1982). However, despite Interstellar'''s near-identical central melody and instrumentation, few have criticized Zimmer when drawing the comparison. Time Out Londons Dave Calhoun exclaimed, "Listen to unnerving silence as well as Hans Zimmer's organ-heavy score!" Tim Robey of The Telegraph felt "With the vast sounds of a composer set loose on his grandest ever assignment. But it relies less on Straussian majesty à la 2001 than something rather more pointed: the hypnotic, metronomically surging, and oddly sacred homage Zimmer gives us to Koyaanisqatsi, by Philip Glass." Todd McCarthy, reviewing for The Hollywood Reporter, praised it as, "soaring, sometimes domineering and unconventionally orchestrated wall-of-sound score" Richard Corliss of Time called it "pounding organ score". Jeremy Aspinall of Radio Times called the score subtle but evocative. Critic Jeffrey M. Anderson for The San Francisco Examiner writes, "rumbling and thundering sound effects and music". At The Irish Times, Donald Clarke wrote that "Hans Zimmer slumps on the biggest pipe organ in town". For NPR, Chris Klimek stated that Zimmer's gives a church-organ score. Joe Morgenstern for Wall Street Journal felt that "At one point the orchestral churnings of Hans Zimmer's score suggest something epic under way". American film critic Peter Travers at Rolling Stone noted, "thrilling images oomphed by Hans Zimmer's score, and you'll get the meaning of "‘rock the house.‘" For The Globe and Mail, Liam Lacey stated, "Throughout, Hans Zimmer's music throbs obtrusively, occasionally fighting with the dialogue for our attention." "As usual, Nolan's frequent collaborator Hans Zimmer has come up with a score that fits the impossible dimensions of the film, and the music adds tremendously to the excitement", said critic Rene Rodriguez, writing for The Miami Herald. Ann Hornaday for The Washington Post'' commented, "Hans Zimmer's basso profundo organ-music score and pummeling sound effects." Steven Biscotti of Soundtrack.net too praised the soundtrack stating, "Hans Zimmer has created a close to perfect musical canvas for those extremely dedicated to the audio experience. The compositional technique on the album may turn off a few, as it is different than Zimmer's recent offerings. However, for those that stick with the album, they will see it 'not go gentle into that good night.' Zimmer's Interstellar rages!" and awarded a perfect five out of five stars.

In response to criticisms about the music being too overpowering and at times drowning out the dialogue, Nolan told The Hollywood Reporter: "Many of the filmmakers I’ve admired over the years have used sound in bold and adventurous ways. I don’t agree with the idea that you can only achieve clarity through dialogue. Clarity of story, clarity of emotions—I  try to achieve that in a very layered way using all the different things at my disposal—picture and sound."

Jonathan Broxton of Movie Music UK acclaimed the album, stating, "The orchestration choices, especially the stripped down ensemble and the use of the pipe organ, shows a composer not afraid to think outside the box, and find unique solutions to the musical problems his film presents, and the emotional content of the score is high, but not overwhelming", and summarised with, "It's an absolute lock for an Oscar nomination, and is one of the best scores of 2014." Tangerine Circus's guitarist Francesc Messeguer cited the score and the film as one of his top 5 favorite albums and films, respectively.

In his in-depth musical analysis, Mark Richards of Film Music Notes concludes: "Rather than simply being associated with a certain character or group of characters, Zimmer’s themes tend to emphasize the emotions a particular character or group is feeling at various points in the film. [...] Interstellar has at its core an emotional story of love between a father and his daughter. Appropriately, Hans Zimmer places the Murph and Cooper theme front and center in the score [...]. Of course, since the film also includes some riveting action sequences, the score does make use of an action theme, but in typical Zimmer style, this theme serves two different functions as it is also the familial love theme. [...] And Zimmer also captures Interstellar’s focus on the wonder of the natural world in a separate theme. Thus, the score provides an effective glue for the film by drawing emotional links between various events, character motivations, and visual spectacles that might otherwise seem rather disconnected."

Track listing

Standard edition

Deluxe edition bonus tracks

Illuminated Star Projection edition

Vinyl Edition (Standard)

MovieTickets.com bonus track

Personnel credits
Credits adapted from CD liner notes.

All music composed by Hans Zimmer

Producers: Christopher Nolan, Hans Zimmer, Alex Gibson 
Soundtrack album producers: Chris Craker, Hans Zimmer, Christopher Nolan
Supervising music editor: Alex Gibson
Music editor: Ryan Rubin 
Music consultant: Czarina Russell
Sequencer programming: Andrew Kawczynski, Steve Mazzaro
Music production services: Steven Kofsky
Technical score engineer: Chuck Choi
Technical score engineer: Stephanie McNally
Technical assistants: Jacqueline Friedberg, Leland Cox
Digital instrument design: Mark Wherry
Supervising orchestrator: Bruce Fowler
Orchestrators: Walt Fowler, Suzette Moriarty, Kevin Kaska, Carl Rydlund, Elizabeth Finch, Andrew Kinney
Orchestra conducted by Gavin Greenaway, Richard Harvey
Score recorded at Lyndhurst Hall, Air Studios and Temple Church, London
Score recorded by Geoff Foster, Alan Meyerson
Score mixed by Alan Meyerson
Score mix assistant: John Witt Chapman
Additional engineering: Christian Wenger, Seth Waldmann, Daniel Kresco
Assistant to Hans Zimmer: Cynthia Park
Studio manager for Remote Control Productions: Shalini Singh
Contractor: Isobel Griffiths 
Sampling team: Ben Robinson, Taurees Habib, Raul Vega
Music preparation: Booker T. White
Music librarian: Jill Streater
Score mixed at Remote Control Productions, Santa Monica, California

Air Studios sessions

Air Studios bookings: Alison Burton Booth 
Reader: Chris Craker
Pro Tools recordist at Lyndhurst Hall: Chris Barrett
Pro Tools recordist in Studio 1: Laurence Anslow

Temple Church session

Pro Tools recordist at Temple Church: John Prestage
Assistant / Abbey Road Mobile: John Barrett
Assistant / Abbey Road Mobile: Jon Alexander
Technical engineer: Dan Cole
Technical engineer: Matt Kingdon
Booth reader: Steve Mazzaro
Scoring session photography: Jordan Goldberg
Executive in charge of music for Warner Bros. Pictures: Paul Broucek
Executive in charge of music for Paramount Pictures: Randyspendlove
Executive in charge of Watertower Music: Jason Linn
Art direction and soundtrack coordination: Sandeep Sriram
Music business affairs executive: Lisa Margolis

Featured musicians
Ambient music design: Mario Reinsch
Pipe organ: Roger Sayer
Piano: Hans Zimmer
Violin: Ann Marie Simpson
Steel guitar: Chas Smith
Tuned percussion: Frank Ricotti
Harp: Skaila Kanga 
Synth programming: Hans Zimmer
Leader of the firsts: Thomas Bowes
Leader of the seconds: Roger Garland
First cellist: Caroline Dale 
First French horn: Richard Watkins
First viola: Peter Lale
Bass: Mary Scully

Woodwinds 
Choir: London Voices
Choirmasters: Ben Parry, Terry Edwards
String quartet: Rita Manning, Emlyn Singleton, Bruce White, Tim Gill
Piano quartet: Simon Chamberlain, Dave Arch, John Lenehan, Andy Vinter
Flute 1: Karen Jones
Flute / Piccolo 2: Helen Keen
Flute / Piccolo 3: Paul Edmund-davies 
Flute / Piccolo / Alto 4: Anna Noakes
Flute / Alto 5: Rowland Sutherland
Flute / Alto 6: Siobhan Grealy
Oboe 1: David Theodore
Oboe 2: Matthew Draper
Oboe / Cor anglais 3: Jane Marshall
Oboe / Cor anglais 4: Janey Miller
Clarinet 1: Nicholas Bucknall
Clarinet 2: Nick Rodwell
Clarinet/Bass clarinet – C extension 3: Martin Robertson
Clarinet/Bass clarinet – C extension 4: Duncan Ashby
Clarinet/Eb contrabass clarinet 5: Dave Fuest
Clarinet/Bb contrabass clarinet 6: Alan Andrews
Bassoon 1: Richard Skinner
Bassoon 2: Lorna West
Bassoon/Contrabassoon 3: Rachel Simms
Bassoon/Contrabassoon 4: Gordon Laing

Charts

Weekly charts

Year-end charts

Certifications

References

External links
 
 
 

2014 soundtrack albums
Hans Zimmer soundtracks
WaterTower Music soundtracks